Estevan is the eleventh-largest city in Saskatchewan, Canada. The Souris River runs by the city. This city is surrounded by the Rural Municipality of Estevan No. 5.

History
The first settlers in what was to become Estevan arrived in 1892, along with the expansion of the Canadian Pacific Railway. It was incorporated as a village in 1899, and later became a town in 1906. On March 1, 1957, Estevan acquired the status of a city, which, in Saskatchewan terms, is any community of 5,000 or more.

The name origin is attributed to George Stephen's registered telegraphic address, Estevan. George Stephen was the first President of the Canadian Pacific Railway from 1881 to 1888.

World War I military unit

On December 22, 1915, the 152nd (Weyburn-Estevan) Battalion, CEF was authorised and recruited men from the area before departing to Great Britain on October 3, 1916.

1931 riot
Estevan was the site of the notorious Estevan riot in 1931. Although most of the strikers were from nearby Bienfait, the strike is associated with Estevan because it was in this city the demonstrators were met by members of the Royal Canadian Mounted Police. After the subsequent riot, which lasted 45 minutes, three strikers lay dead. It was later proven the three miners had been killed by the RCMP. The miners had been organised by the Workers' Unity League.

Demographics 

Economy

The major industries in Estevan are coal mining, power generation at nearby Boundary Dam Power Station and Shand Power Station, oil and gas, and agriculture.

Arts and culture

Museums and galleries
The city of Estevan has two museums, one of which is primarily a gallery.

The Estevan Art Gallery and Museum, formerly the Estevan National Exhibition Centre, was founded in 1978. The Estevan Art Gallery is a free public gallery that showcases contemporary art. The Gallery's permanent collection includes woodblock-print works by Andrew King. The Estevan Art Gallery and Museum, EAGM, also features the North-West Mounted Police Wood End Post Historical Site, NWMP Museum. This museum is in a house which is the oldest-known North-West Mounted Police Detachment Post in Saskatchewan and holds a collection related to the North-West Mounted Police and the 1874 March West from Roche Percée to Estevan.

The Souris Valley Museum, SVM, is a local and regional history museum focused on human development and daily life within south-east Saskatchewan. It was founded in 2001, primarily from the collection of Stan Durr. The museum provides an engaging depiction of the social and cultural influences and economic development of south-east Saskatchewan. The collection includes the Schneller Schoolhouse, a Threshing Cook Car, a Homesteader Shack, two of Estevan's original Firetrucks, and a Heritage Mining Display.

Arts council
The Estevan Arts Council, founded in 1967, is a non-profit organisation that offers art classes and workshops, adjudicates art shows, hosts concerts, and provides a youth art scholarships through the work of volunteers and community donations and grants.

Sports

Affinity Place is a 2,650 seat Multi-Purpose Entertainment and Sports Facility that was built to supplement the two other ageing ice surfaces in Estevan, the Civic Auditorium and Lignite Miners Centre. It opened on 15 April 2011. Affinity Place is home to the Estevan Bruins, a junior ice hockey team playing in the Saskatchewan Junior Hockey League (SJHL), and the Midget AAA Estevan Bears. Affinity Place also has a Racquetball court, swimming pool, and a gym. Right next to Affinity Place is the Estevan Curling Club.

The nine-team Saskota Baseball League has two teams in Estevan, the Southeast Diamondbacks and the Estevan Tap House Wolves.

A former Estevan team, the Estevan Bears, played in the Big 6 Hockey League. They won the Lincoln Trophy three straight years from 1985 to 1987. CJSL AM 1150 broadcasts many Big 6 hockey games.

Climate
Estevan has a humid continental climate (Köppen climate classification Dfb) It falls into the NRC Plant Hardiness Zone 4a.

Estevan's climate is characterized by cold, long, and dry winters with warm, short and, relatively humid summers. The precipitation in winter is chiefly snow, averaging . Autumn, as spring, is transitional, being warm in September and cooler in October and November. Estevan is the sunniest city year-round in Canada, and it is also the city with the clearest skies year round in Canada.

Gallery

Local media

Newspapers
 The Estevan Mercury, the newspaper in Estevan since 1903, provides weekly distribution to every household in the City free of charge. The newspaper also provides up-to-date news via online editorial copy and local videos. It also has as free TMC newspaper circulated throughout southeast Saskatchewan to over 9,000 homes; the Southeast Trader Express.
 Pipeline News, Saskatchewan Petroleum Monthly newspaper is also based out of Estevan. Southeast Saskatchewan has a significant amount of oil production, and the Pipeline News' main office is situated locally to report on these matters.
 Estevan Lifestyles is a free circulation weekly publication that shares the stories of the people in the Estevan area and the southeast corner of Saskatchewan. The publication also publishes NewsBreak, a daily coffee paper geared towards lighter reading.

Radio
CJSL AM 1150, CHSN-FM 102.3, and CKSE-FM 106.1 all broadcast from studios on 5th Street in Estevan.
The news website DiscoverEstevan.com is also run by the radio station offering local news, weather, and sports. All are owned by Golden West Broadcasting.

Notable residents

 Blair Atcheynum, National Hockey League (NHL) player
 Dave Batters, politician
 Dennis Cooley, poet
 Kimbi Daniels, hockey player
 Ana Egge, folk singer/songwriter
 Mina Forsyth, artist
 Eric Grimson, computer scientist, educator
 Chris Henderson, musician
 Howard Hilstrom, politician
 Andrew David Irvine, playwright
 Tanner Jeannot, NHL player for Nashville Predators
 Todd Kerns, musician
 Ross King, author
 Bill Knight, politician
 Ed Komarnicki, politician
 Greg Lawrence, politician
 Eli Mandel, poet
 Fred Mandel, session musician
 Punch McLean, hockey coach
 Gerald McLellan, Saskatchewan ombudsman
 Al Nicholson, hockey player
 Derrick Pouliot, NHL player
 Arnold Richardson, curler
 Andy Shauf, musician
 Kim Thorson, lawyer and politician
 Blaine Thurier, musician and film producer
 Galen Wahlmeier, Canadian Football League (CFL) player and mayor

See also
List of communities in Saskatchewan
List of cities in Saskatchewan
Coal mining in Saskatchewan

References

Notes

External links

 
1892 establishments in Canada
Cities in Saskatchewan
Mining communities in Saskatchewan
Populated places established in 1892